Shabu Town is a suburb and a gateway town of the city of Lafia, the capital of Nasarawa State in central Nigeria.

Shabu Town, along with the city of Lafia, forms the Lafia metropolis.

Notes

References 

Populated places in Nasarawa State